Bernd Kneißler (born 13 September 1962) is a retired West German shot putter.

He finished ninth at the 1990 European Indoor Championships. Kneißler represented the sports club Salamander Kornwestheim, and became West German champion in 1985.

His personal best throw was 20.27 metres, achieved in August 1990 in Leverkusen.

References

1962 births
Living people
West German male shot putters
SV Salamander Kornwestheim athletes